Ethyl isovalerate is an organic compound that is the ester formed from ethyl alcohol and isovaleric acid.  It has a fruity odor and flavor and is used in perfumery and as a food additive.

References

Ethyl esters
Isovalerate esters